Jacqueline Solíz (born 22 September 1964) is a Bolivian sprinter. She competed in the women's 200 metres at the 1992 Summer Olympics.

References

1964 births
Living people
Athletes (track and field) at the 1992 Summer Olympics
Bolivian female sprinters
Olympic athletes of Bolivia
Place of birth missing (living people)
Olympic female sprinters